The Mummy Returns is a 2001 American adventure horror film written and directed by Stephen Sommers, starring Brendan Fraser, Rachel Weisz, John Hannah, Arnold Vosloo, Oded Fehr, Patricia Velásquez, Freddie Boath, Alun Armstrong, and Dwayne Johnson in his film acting debut. The film is a sequel to the 1999 film The Mummy and was distributed by Universal Pictures.

The Mummy Returns inspired the 2002 prequel film The Scorpion King, a spin-off that is set 5,000 years prior and whose eponymous character, played by Dwayne Johnson (The Rock), was introduced in this film. The Mummy Returns was a commercial success despite mixed reviews.

Plot

In 3067 BC, a fearsome warrior known as the Scorpion King leads an army to conquer the world. However, they are eventually defeated and exiled to the desert of Ahm Shere. Dying, the Scorpion King vows to give Anubis his soul in return for the power to defeat his enemies. Anubis accepts, magically conjuring an oasis and golden pyramid, and giving the Scorpion King an army of jackal-like warriors to conquer Egypt. However, once his task is finished, Anubis claims the Scorpion King's soul and the army is returned to the Underworld.

In 1933, Rick O'Connell and his wife Evelyn explore ancient ruins with their son, Alex, finding the Bracelet of Anubis. In London, the bracelet locks onto Alex, showing him visions directing him to Ahm Shere. Evelyn is attacked and captured by a cult who resurrect Imhotep with the Book of the Dead; they wish to use his power to defeat the Scorpion King, which would give them command of Anubis' army. The cult, led by museum curator Baltus Hafez, includes enforcer Lock-Nah and Meela Nais, the physical reincarnation of Imhotep's love Anck-su-namun. Rick and Alex set out to rescue Evelyn with the help of her brother Jonathan, who had gotten his hands on a mysterious golden scepter, and the Medjai Ardeth Bay, who has returned to help them.

Rick frees Evelyn after a massive battle, but Alex is soon after kidnapped and forced to lead the cult with his visions from the bracelet. The O'Connells pursue them with Rick's associate Izzy. Along the way, Alex leaves clues for his parents, who follow in Izzy's dirigible. Imhotep uses the Book of the Dead to restore Anck-su-namun's soul into Meela's body, but by doing so, he unwittingly allows Evelyn to unlock the memories of her previous life as Princess Nefertiri, the bracelet's keeper and Pharaoh Seti I's daughter.

At the edge of the Oasis, Imhotep realises they are being pursued and uses his magic to crash the dirigible; Izzy stays behind to repair it. The O'Connells infiltrate the cult, but both groups are attacked by pygmy mummies. Rick retrieves Alex while Ardeth kills Lock-Nah. They escape the pygmies, who kill all the cult members except for Hafez, Imhotep, and Anck-su-namun. The O'Connells arrive at the pyramid, and the bracelet detaches from Alex. Anck-su-namun, Imhotep, and Hafez then arrive and kill Evelyn before entering the pyramid.

Inside the pyramid, Hafez uses the bracelet to conjure Anubis' army, which appears outside of the Oasis.  Rick finds Imhotep summoning the Scorpion King and attacks him. The Scorpion King, now an enormous scorpion monster, interrupts the fight. Imhotep tricks him into attacking Rick while outside, Ardeth and the Medjai battle Anubis's resurrected army.  While Rick and the Scorpion King fight, Hafez is caught in the melee and killed. Meanwhile, Jonathan and Alex steal the Book of the Dead from Anck-su-namun and use it to resurrect Evelyn. Rick discovers hieroglyphs explaining that Jonathan's scepter is actually the mystical Spear of Osiris. With the help of Jonathan and the resurrected Evelyn, Rick gets the scepter and uses it to slay the Scorpion King, sending him and the army back into the Underworld.

As the oasis begins to implode and the pyramid crumbles, Rick and Imhotep cling to the ledge of a pit that leads to the underworld. Rick implores Evelyn to escape before it is too late, but she risks her life to pull Rick to safety. Seeing this, Imhotep pleads for Anck-su-namun to do the same, but she abandons him. Heartbroken, Imhotep lets go and falls into the underworld. While fleeing, Anck-su-namun inadvertently falls into a pit of scarabs and scorpions, killing her. 

At the last moment, Izzy arrives with a modified dirigible and rescues the O'Connells just before the oasis and the pyramid are totally destroyed—though not before Jonathan swipes the pyramid's diamond capstone. They depart into the sunset, with Ardeth Bay saluting them before riding off.

Cast

 Brendan Fraser as Rick O'Connell, a treasure hunter and former Legionnaire
 Rachel Weisz as Evelyn O'Connell / Nefertiri; respectively, Rick's wife, and the daughter of Pharaoh Seti I
 John Hannah as Jonathan Carnahan, Evelyn's brother
 Arnold Vosloo as Imhotep, High Priest of Osiris and lover of Anck-Su-Namun
 Oded Fehr as Ardeth Bay, a Medjai chieftain and warrior
 Patricia Velásquez as Meela Nais / Anck-su-namun, the mistress of Pharaoh Seti I, and secret lover of Imhotep
 Freddie Boath as Alex O'Connell, Rick and Evelyn's son
 Alun Armstrong as Baltus Hafez, the cult leader
 Dwayne Johnson as Mathayus of Akkad / The Scorpion King, an ancient warrior who sold his soul to Anubis
 Adewale Akinnuoye-Agbaje as Lock-Nah, a cult enforcer
 Shaun Parkes as Izzy Buttons, Rick's friend and a dirigible pilot
 Bruce Byron as Red Willits, a thief contracted by the cult to claim the Bracelet of Anubis
 Joe Dixon as Jacques, a thief contracted by the cult to claim the Bracelet of Anubis
 Tom Fisher as Spivey, a thief contracted by the cult to claim the Bracelet of Anubis
 Aharon Ipalé as Pharaoh Seti I, the Pharaoh of Egypt, whom Imhotep killed in 1290 BC

Music

The Mummy Returns: Original Motion Picture Soundtrack was released on May 1, 2001 by Decca Records.

It contains the score composed and conducted by Alan Silvestri as well as a version of the song "Forever May Not Be Long Enough" by the rock band Live, which slightly differs from the song's album version.
A 2-CD expansion was released by Intrada Records in 2018.

Reception

Box office
The Mummy Returns earned $23.4 million on its first day of release, then made $26.8 million the day after. This made it the highest Friday and Saturday grosses, surpassing both Toy Story 2 and The Lost World: Jurassic Park respectively. Later that year, those records were simultaneously given to Planet of the Apes and Harry Potter and the Sorcerer's Stone. During its opening weekend, the film made $68.1 million, making it the then second highest opening weekend of all time, only behind The Lost World: Jurassic Park. Moreover, it surpassed Hannibal to have the highest opening weekend for a 2001 film, joining Monsters, Inc., Rush Hour 2 and Planet of the Apes to become one of the only four films of that year to make $60 million in their first three days of release. The film also became one of four consecutive Universal films of the year to cross the $40 million in an opening weekend, with the others being American Pie 2, The Fast and the Furious and Jurassic Park III. The Mummy Returns would remain in the number one spot at the box office for two weeks until Shrek took it.

The film grossed $202 million in the United States and Canada box offices and $233 million internationally, grossing over $435 million worldwide, making it the seventh-highest-grossing film of 2001.

Critical response
The Mummy Returns received mixed reviews from critics. It currently holds a 47% rating on Rotten Tomatoes based on 141 reviews, with an average rating of 5.30/10. The site's consensus states: "In The Mummy Returns, the special effects are impressive, but the characters seem secondary to the computer generated imagery." Metacritic reported an average rating of 48 out of 100 based on 31 reviews, indicating "mixed or average reviews." Audiences polled by CinemaScore gave the film an average grade of "A−" on an A+ to F scale.

Roger Ebert, who awarded the first film three stars, gave the second film only two, saying that "The mistake of The Mummy Returns is to abandon the characters, and to use the plot only as a clothesline for special effects and action sequences." James Berardinelli of ReelViews gave the film two and a half stars (out of four), calling it "hollow, lightweight entertainment—not unpleasant, but far from the summer's definitive action/adventure flick.

Kenneth Turan of the Los Angeles Times gave the film a positive review, praising its "constant plot turns, cheeky sensibility and omnipresent action sequences." Todd McCarthy of Variety praised "the nonstop action of the final hour", saying that it "bursts with visual goodies."

Joe Morgenstern of The Wall Street Journal gave the film a negative review, saying that it "has all of the clank but none of the swank of the previous version." Charles Taylor of Salon.com was also not impressed, calling The Mummy Returns "everything the first Mummy was fun for not being."

Accolades

Home media
The Mummy Returns debuted on VHS and DVD on October 2, 2001. It would become the fastest-selling DVD ever in the United States with 2 million copies being sold after its first week. This record would be taken by Star Wars: Episode I – The Phantom Menace just two weeks later. The film was subsequently released on the high-definition Blu-ray format in July 2008, and on UHD Blu-ray in 2017.

Sequel

References

External links

2001 films
2001 horror films
2000s adventure films
2000s English-language films
American sequel films
American sword and sorcery films
Egyptian-language films
Egyptian mythology in popular culture
Fiction set in the 4th millennium BC
Films about child abduction
Films directed by Stephen Sommers
Films scored by Alan Silvestri
Films set in 1933
Films set in ancient Egypt
Films shot in Morocco
Films with screenplays by Stephen Sommers
The Mummy (franchise)
Seti I
Universal Pictures films
British Museum in media
Films set in museums
Films shot in Bedfordshire
2000s American films